The siege of Granville occurred at Granville, Manche on 14 November 1793. It faced 5,000 Republicans besieged by Vendéen forces during the Virée de Galerne. The battle ended with a Republican victory.

Battle

A rumour ran through the Vendéen ranks that if they reached a port the English would come to their aid. Their first choice was the port at Saint-Malo but they finally fixed on Granville, apparently less well-defended. On 14 November the Vendéens arrived before the city, but they had no siege equipment and the English had not shown up. Even so, the Vendéens launched an assault and took the suburbs, but their advance was hampered when a fire which broke out and burned down the suburbs. The Vendéens thus passed by the grêve and began to climb the rocks at the foot of the ramparts, when cries of "Treason!" began to spread through their ranks, probably shouted by Republican spies. Quickly panic overtook the Vendéens and, as many fled, the assault failed. Having heard no news of the English forces (despite their actually being very nearby, at Jersey), La Rochejaquelein decided to raise the siege.

Results
This victory was decisive for the Republicans, who thus avoided the Vendéens and Chouans joining up with the English forces. Discouraged, the Vendéens made an about-turn in an attempt to cross the river Loire again, and managed to fight several more battles in the campaign.

Battles of the War in the Vendée
Conflicts in 1793
History of Manche
Military history of Normandy